Lampronia rupella is a moth of the family Prodoxidae. It is found in most of Europe, with the exception of Iceland, Ireland, Great Britain, the Benelux, the Iberian Peninsula, Croatia and Slovenia.

The wingspan is 13–16 mm.

The larvae feed on Asteraceae species.

External links
 Swedish Moths
 Lepiforum.de

Prodoxidae
Moths of Europe
Taxa named by Michael Denis
Taxa named by Ignaz Schiffermüller
Moths described in 1775